The Journal of Supply Chain Management is a quarterly peer-reviewed academic journal that was established in 1965. The journal covers supply chain management, operations management, marketing, strategic management, and social network analysis. It is published by Wiley-Blackwell and the editors-in-chief are Wendy L. Tate (University of Tennessee, Knoxville), Andreas Wieland (Copenhagen Business School), and Tingting Yan (Wayne State University).

History
The journal was established in 1965 as the Journal of Purchasing. It was renamed Journal of Purchasing and Materials Management in 1974, then renamed International Journal of Purchasing and Materials Management in 1991, obtaining its current name in 1999.

Editors-in-chief
The following persons are or have been editor-in-chief:

Reception
The journal is rated class 4 ("top journals in their field", 4* being the highest score) in the Chartered Association of Business Schools' 2021 Academic Journal Guide and class "A" (middle class of three) in the 2023 BWL Meta Rating. It is also one of four empirical journals used by the SCM Journal List to rank universities' supply chain management research output. According to the Journal Citation Reports, its 2021 impact factor is 8.025.

Abstracting and indexing
The journal is abstracted and indexed in:

Most cited articles
According to the Science Citation Index Expanded, the following three articles have been cited most often (>450 times):

See also
Supply Chain Management
Supply Chain Management Review

References

External links

Business and management journals
Supply chain management
English-language journals
Wiley-Blackwell academic journals
Publications established in 1965
Quarterly journals